This is a list of members of the Victorian Legislative Council from the elections of 11 September 1902 to the elections of 1 June 1904.

From 1889 there were fourteen Provinces and a total of 48 members.

Note the "Term in Office" refers to that members term(s) in the Council, not necessarily for that Province.

Henry Wrixon was President of the Council; Frederick Brown was Chairman of Committees.

 Brown died 9 July 1903; replaced by Willis Little in August 1903.
 McCulloch resigned November 1903; replaced by Samuel Wesley Vary in December 1903.
 Reid resigned February 1903; replaced by William Cain in February 1903.
 Smith resigned November 1903; replaced by Thomas Luxton in December 1903.
 Thornley died 1 March 1903; replaced by Robert Blackwood Ritchie in April 1903.
 Williams resigned November 1903; replaced by Richard Rees in December 1903.
 Wynne resigned November 1903; replaced by Alexander Magnus MacLeod in December 1903.

References

 Re-member (a database of all Victorian MPs since 1851).

Members of the Parliament of Victoria by term
20th-century Australian politicians